Uzbekistan competed at the 2022 World Games held in Birmingham, United States from 7 to 17 July 2022. Athletes representing Uzbekistan won one silver medal and one bronze medal. The country finished in 60th place in the medal table.

Medalists

Invitational sports

Competitors
The following is the list of number of competitors in the Games.

Ju-jitsu

One competitor was scheduled to represent Uzbekistan in ju-jitsu.

Karate

Uzbekistan won one bronze medal in karate.

Muaythai

Uzbekistan competed in muaythai.

Rhythmic gymnastics

Uzbekistan competed in rhythmic gymnastics.

Wushu

Uzbekistan won one silver medal in wushu.

References

Nations at the 2022 World Games
2022
World Games